The Mormon Battalion Historic Site is a historic site in Old Town, San Diego, California, in honor of the members of the Church of Jesus Christ of Latter-day Saints (LDS Church) who served in the United States Army's Mormon Battalion during the Mexican–American War of 1846–1848. The battalion was stationed in Old Town in 1847, and they built wells and a courthouse on the site. In the 1960s, the LDS Church opened a visitor center to commemorate their historical ties to San Diego. A new visitor center was dedicated on January 30, 2010.

See also
Mormon Battalion Monument

References

Mormon Battalion
Buildings and structures in San Diego
Properties of the Church of Jesus Christ of Latter-day Saints